Pump Back is a census-designated place (CDP) in Mayes County, Oklahoma, United States. The population was 175 at the 2010 census compared to 155 at the 2000 census, a gain of 13 percent.

Geography
Pump Back is located at  (36.271183, -95.112110). It is accessible from State Highway 82, between Lake Hudson and Lake W. R. Holway (a.k a. Chimney Rock Lake).

Demographics

As of the census of 2000, there were 155 people, 64 households, and 49 families residing in the CDP. The population density was 73.9 people per square mile (28.5/km2). There were 93 housing units at an average density of 44.4/sq mi (17.1/km2). The racial makeup of the CDP was 69.03 percent White, 23.87 percent Native American, and 7.10 percent from two or more races. Hispanic or Latino of any race were 1.94 percent of the population.

There were 64 households, out of which 18.8 percent had children under the age of 18 living with them, 64.1 percent were married couples living together, 6.3 percent had a female householder with no husband present, and 23.4 percent were non-families. 20.3 percent of all households were made up of individuals, and 6.3 percent had someone living alone who was 65 years of age or older. The average household size was 2.42 and the average family size was 2.78.

In the CDP, the population was spread out, with 20.0 percent under the age of 18, 9.7 percent from 18 to 24, 11.6 percent from 25 to 44, 34.2 percent from 45 to 64, and 24.5 percent who were 65 years of age or older. The median age was 51 years. For every 100 females, there were 106.7 males. For every 100 females age 18 and over, there were 103.3 males.

The median income for a household in the CDP was $19,886, and the median income for a family was $27,679. Males had a median income of $36,429 versus $19,625 for females. The per capita income for the CDP was $14,448. About 34.9 percent of families and 40.3 percent of the population were below the poverty line, including 64.6 percent of those under the age of 18 and 10.3 percent of those 65 or over.

References

Census-designated places in Mayes County, Oklahoma
Census-designated places in Oklahoma